Mount Henson is an ice free summit,  high, standing at the northeastern extremity of the Mayer Crags, forming the northwest portal to Liv Glacier where the latter enters the Ross Ice Shelf, Antarctica. It was discovered and photographed by the Byrd Antarctic Expedition in November 1929, and named for Matthew Henson, a member of Rear Admiral Robert Peary's party which reached the North Pole in 1909.

References

Mountains of the Ross Dependency
Amundsen Coast